The bibliography of Raymond Carver consists of 72 short stories, 306 poems, a novel fragment, a one-act play, a screenplay co-written with Tess Gallagher, and 32 pieces of non-fiction (essays, a meditation, introductions, and book reviews). In 2009 the 17 stories collected in What We Talk About When We Talk About Love were published in their manuscript form, prior to Gordon Lish's extensive editing, under the title Beginners.

Complete works
Raymond Carver's complete published works are collected in the following volumes:

 Collected Stories (Library of America, 2009) - includes the complete fiction (72 short stories, 1 novel fragment, 17 manuscript versions)1
 All of Us (Vintage, 2000) - includes the complete poetry (306 poems)
 Call If You Need Me: The Uncollected Fiction and Other Prose (Vintage, 2001) - includes the complete non-fiction (5 essays, 1 meditation, 8 comments on work, 6 introductions, 12 book reviews)2

 1The book also includes 4 essays
 2The book also includes 11 works of fiction

Two texts which are not included in any of the collections above were published separately:
 Dostoevsky (Capra, 1985) - screenplay (co-written with Tess Gallagher)
 Carnations (Engdahl Typography, 1992) - a one-act play.

Books

British editions

Chapbooks and Limited Editions

Short stories
{| class="wikitable"
|-
! Title !! Originally published in !! Collected in: !! Notes
|-
| "Fat" || Harper's Bazaar, September 1971 || Will You Please Be Quiet, Please? (1976);Where I'm Calling From (1988); Collected Stories (2009)||
|-
| "Neighbors" || Esquire, June 1971 || Will You Please Be Quiet, Please? (1976);Where I'm Calling From (1988); Collected Stories (2009)||
|-
| "The Idea" || Northwest Review, 1971-72|| Will You Please Be Quiet, Please? (1976); Collected Stories (2009)||
|-
| "They're Not Your Husband" || Chicago Review, 1973 || Will You Please Be Quiet, Please? (1976);Where I'm Calling From (1988); Collected Stories (2009)||
|-
| "Are You a Doctor?" || Fiction, 1973 || Will You Please Be Quiet, Please? (1976); Collected Stories (2009)||
|-
| "The Father" || Toyon, 1961 || Will You Please Be Quiet, Please? (1976); Collected Stories (2009)||
|-
| "Nobody Said Anything" || Seneca Review, 1970 || Will You Please Be Quiet, Please? (1976);Where I'm Calling From (1988);Collected Stories (2009)||
|-
| "Sixty Acres" || Discourse, 1969 || Will You Please Be Quiet, Please? (1976); Collected Stories (2009)||
|-
| "What's in Alaska?" || Iowa Review, 1972 || Will You Please Be Quiet, Please? (1976);Where I'm Calling From (1988); Collected Stories (2009)||
|-
| "Night School" || North American Review, 1971 || Will You Please Be Quiet, Please? (1976); Collected Stories (2009)||
|-
| "Collectors" || Esquire, August 1975 || Will You Please Be Quiet, Please? (1976);Where I'm Calling From (1988); Collected Stories (2009)||
|-
| "What Do You Do in San Francisco?" || Colorado State Review, 1967 || Will You Please Be Quiet, Please? (1976);Where I'm Calling From (1988); Collected Stories (2009)||
|-
| "The Student's Wife" || Carolina Quarterly, 1964 || Will You Please Be Quiet, Please? (1976);Where I'm Calling From (1988); Collected Stories (2009)||
|-
| "Put Yourself in My Shoes" || Iowa Review, 1972 || Will You Please Be Quiet, Please? (1976);Where I'm Calling From (1988); Collected Stories (2009)||
|-
| "Jerry and Molly and Sam" || Perspective, 1972 || Will You Please Be Quiet, Please? (1976); Collected Stories (2009)||
|-
| "Why, Honey?" || Sou'wester, 1972 || Will You Please Be Quiet, Please? (1976);Where I'm Calling From (1988); Collected Stories (2009)||
|-
| "The Ducks" || Carolina Quarterly, 1963 || Will You Please Be Quiet, Please? (1976); Collected Stories (2009)||
|-
| "How About This?" || Western Humanities Review, 1970 || Will You Please Be Quiet, Please? (1976); Collected Stories (2009)||
|-
| "Bicycles, Muscles, Cigarets" || Kansas Quarterly, 1973 || Will You Please Be Quiet, Please? (1976);Where I'm Calling From (1988); Collected Stories (2009)||
|-
| "What Is It?" || Esquire, 1972 || Will You Please Be Quiet, Please? (1976);Where I'm Calling From (1988); Collected Stories (2009)|| Titled "Are These Actual Miles?"in Where I'm Calling From (1988)
|-
| "Signals" || December, 1970 || Will You Please Be Quiet, Please? (1976); Collected Stories (2009)||
|-
| "Will You Please Be Quiet, Please?" || December, 1966 || Will You Please Be Quiet, Please? (1976); Collected Stories (2009)||
|-
| "Pastoral" || Western Humanities Review, Winter 1963 || Furious Seasons and Other Stories (1977); Collected Stories (2009)||
|-
| "Furious Seasons" || Selection, Winter 1960-1961 || Furious Seasons and Other Stories (1977); Collected Stories (2009)||
|-
| "Why Don't You Dance?" || Quarterly West, 1978 || What We Talk About When We Talk About Love (1981);Where I'm Calling From (1988); Collected Stories (2009)|| Manuscript version appears inBeginners (2009) and Collected Stories (2009).
|-
| "Viewfinder" || Quarterly West, 1978 || What We Talk About When We Talk About Love (1981); Collected Stories (2009)|| Manuscript version appears inBeginners (2009) and Collected Stories (2009).
|-
| "Mr. Coffee and Mr. Fixit" || TriQuarterly, 1980 || What We Talk About When We Talk About Love (1981); Collected Stories (2009)|| Manuscript version appears inBeginners (2009) and Collected Stories (2009).
|-
| "Gazebo" || Missouri Review, 1980 || What We Talk About When We Talk About Love (1981);Where I'm Calling From (1988); Collected Stories (2009)|| Manuscript version appears inBeginners (2009) and Collected Stories (2009).
|-
| "I Could See the Smallest Things" || Missouri Review, 1980 || What We Talk About When We Talk About Love (1981); Collected Stories (2009)|| Manuscript version appears inBeginners (2009) and Collected Stories (2009).
|-
| "Sacks" || Perspective, 1974 || What We Talk About When We Talk About Love (1981); Collected Stories (2009)|| Manuscript version appears inBeginners (2009) and Collected Stories (2009).
|-
| "The Bath" || Columbia, 1981 || What We Talk About When We Talk About Love (1981); Collected Stories (2009)|| Manuscript version appears inBeginners (2009) and Collected Stories (2009). Republished as "A Small, Good Thing" in rewritten and expanded form in Cathedral.
|-
| "Tell the Women We're Going" || Sou'wester, 1971 || What We Talk About When We Talk About Love (1981); Collected Stories (2009)|| Manuscript version appears inBeginners (2009) and Collected Stories (2009).
|-
| "After the Denim" || New England Review, 1981 || What We Talk About When We Talk About Love (1981); Collected Stories (2009)|| Manuscript version appears inBeginners (2009) and Collected Stories (2009).
|-
| "So Much Water So Close to Home" || Spectrum, 1975 || What We Talk About When We Talk About Love (1981);Where I'm Calling From (1988); Collected Stories (2009)|| Manuscript version appears inBeginners (2009) and Collected Stories (2009).
|-
| "The Third Thing That Killed My Father"|| Discourse, 1967 || What We Talk About When We Talk About Love (1981);Where I'm Calling From (1988); Collected Stories (2009)|| Manuscript version appears inBeginners (2009) and Collected Stories (2009).
|-
| "A Serious Talk" || Playgirl, 1980 || What We Talk About When We Talk About Love (1981);Where I'm Calling From (1988); Collected Stories (2009)|| Manuscript version appears inBeginners (2009) and Collected Stories (2009).
|-
| "The Calm" || Iowa Review, 1979 || What We Talk About When We Talk About Love (1981); Collected Stories (2009)|| Manuscript version appears inBeginners (2009) and Collected Stories (2009).
|-
| "Popular Mechanics" || Playgirl, March 1978 || What We Talk About When We Talk About Love (1981);Where I'm Calling From (1988); Collected Stories (2009)|| Titled "Little Things" in Where I'm Calling From (1988);manuscript version titled "Mine" appears inBeginners (2009) and Collected Stories (2009).
|-
| "Everything Stuck to Him" || Chariton Review, Fall 1975(as "Distance") || Furious Seasons and Other Stories (1977);Fires (1983);What We Talk About When We Talk About Love (1981);Where I'm Calling From (1988); Collected Stories (2009)|| Titled "Distance" in Where I'm Calling From (1988)Manuscript version titled "Distance" appears inBeginners (2009) and Collected Stories (2009).
|-
| "What We Talk About When We Talk About Love" || Antaeus, 1981 || What We Talk About When We Talk About Love (1981);Where I'm Calling From (1988); Collected Stories (2009)|| Manuscript version appears inBeginners (2009) and Collected Stories (2009).
|-
| "One More Thing" || North American Review, 1979 || What We Talk About When We Talk About Love (1981);Where I'm Calling From (1988); Collected Stories (2009)|| Manuscript version appears inBeginners (2009) and Collected Stories (2009).
|-
| "The Lie" || Sou'wester, 1971 || Fires (1983); Collected Stories (2009) ||
|-
| "The Cabin" || Western Humanities Review, 1963 || Fires (1983); Collected Stories (2009) ||
|-
| "Harry's Death" || Eureka Review, 1975-76 || Fires (1983); Collected Stories (2009) ||
|-
| "The Pheasant" || Occident, 1973 || Fires (1983); Collected Stories (2009) ||
|-
| "Feathers" || The Atlantic Monthly, September 1982 || Cathedral (1983); Collected Stories (2009)||
|-
| "Chef's House" || The New Yorker, November 30, 1981 || Cathedral (1983); Collected Stories (2009)||
|-
| "Preservation" || Grand Street, 1983 || Cathedral (1983); Collected Stories (2009)||
|-
| "The Compartment" || Granta, June 1983 || Cathedral (1983); Collected Stories (2009)||
|-
| "A Small, Good Thing" || Columbia, 1981 || Cathedral (1983); Collected Stories (2009)|| Originally published as "The Bath" in What We Talk About When We Talk About  Love in a shorter form.
|-
| "Vitamins" || Granta, March 1981 || Cathedral (1983); Collected Stories (2009)||
|-
| "Careful" || The Paris Review, 1983 || Cathedral (1983); Collected Stories (2009)||
|-
| "Where I'm Calling From" || The New Yorker, March 15, 1982 || Cathedral (1983); Collected Stories (2009)||
|-
| "The Train" || Antaeus, 1983 || Cathedral (1983); Collected Stories (2009)||
|-
| "Fever" || North American Review, 1983 || Cathedral (1983); Collected Stories (2009)||
|-
| "The Bridle" || The New Yorker, July 19, 1982 || Cathedral (1983); Collected Stories (2009)||
|-
| "Cathedral" || The Atlantic Monthly, September 1981 || Cathedral (1983); Where I'm Calling From (1988); Collected Stories (2009)||
|-
| "Boxes" || The New Yorker, February 24, 1986 || Where I'm Calling From (1988); Elephant and Other Stories (1988);Collected Stories (2009) ||
|-
| "Whoever Was Using This Bed" || The New Yorker, April 28, 1986 || Where I'm Calling From (1988); Elephant and Other Stories (1988);Collected Stories (2009) ||
|-
| "Intimacy" || Esquire, August 1986 || Where I'm Calling From (1988); Elephant and Other Stories (1988);Collected Stories (2009) ||
|-
| "Menudo" || Granta, 1987 || Where I'm Calling From (1988); Elephant and Other Stories (1988);Collected Stories (2009) ||
|-
| "Elephant" || The New Yorker, June 9, 1986 || Where I'm Calling From (1988); Elephant and Other Stories (1988);Collected Stories (2009) ||
|-
| "Blackbird Pie" || The New Yorker, July 7, 1986 || Where I'm Calling From (1988); Elephant and Other Stories (1988);Collected Stories (2009) ||
|-
| "Errand" || The New Yorker, June 1, 1987 || Where I'm Calling From (1988); Elephant and Other Stories (1988);Collected Stories (2009) ||
|-
| "The Hair" || Toyon, 1963 || Call If You Need Me (2000);Collected Stories (2009) ||
|-
| "The Aficionados" || Toyon, 1963 || Call If You Need Me (2000);Collected Stories (2009) ||
|-
| "Poseidon and Company" || Toyon, 1963 || Call If You Need Me (2000);Collected Stories (2009) ||
|-
| "Bright Red Apples" || Gato Magazine, 1967 || Call If You Need Me (2000);Collected Stories (2009) ||
|-
| "Kindling" || Esquire, July 1999 || Call If You Need Me (2000);Collected Stories (2009) ||
|-
| "What Would You Like to See?" || The Guardian, June 24, 2000 || Call If You Need Me (2000);Collected Stories (2009) ||
|-
| "Dreams" || Esquire, August 2000 || 'Call If You Need Me (2000);Collected Stories (2009) ||
|-
| "Vandals" || Esquire, October 1999 || Call If You Need Me (2000);Collected Stories (2009) ||
|-
| "Call If You Need Me" || Granta, 1999 || Call If You Need Me (2000);Collected Stories (2009) ||
|}

Poetry
Carver's 306 poems are collected in All Of Us (1996) after previously appearing in the collections: Near Klamath (1968), Winter Insomnia (1970), At Night The Salmon Move (1976), Fires (1983), Where Water Comes Together With Other Water (1985),This Water (1985), Ultramarine (1986), Early For The Dance (1986), Those Days: Early Writings By Raymond Carver: Eleven Poems And A Story (1987), In A Marine Light: Selected Poems (1987), A New Path To The Waterfall (1989), and No Heroics, Please (1991).

Notable poems include "Photograph of My Father in His Twenty-Second Year", which grew out of the essay "My Father's Life", and "Gravy", which was published in The New Yorker in August 1988 following Carver's death. The poems "Late Fragment" and "Gravy" are both inscribed on his tombstone.

The Poems

 "Drinking while Driving"
 "Luck"
 "Distress Sale"
 "Your Dog Dies"
 "Photograph of My Father in His Twenty-Second Year"
 "Hamid Ramouz (1818–1906)"
 "Bankruptcy"
 "The Baker"
 "Iowa Summer"
 "Alcohol"
 "For Semra, with Martial Vigor"
 "Looking for Work 1"
 "Cheers"
 "Rogue River Jet-Boat Trip, Gold Beach, Oregon, July 4, 1977"
 "You Don't Know What Love Is"
 "Morning, Thinking of Empire"
 "The Blue Stones"
 "Tel Aviv and Life on the Mississippi"
 "The News Carried to Macedonia"
 "The Mosque in Jaffa"
 "Not Far from Here"
 "Sudden Rain"
 "Balzac"
 "Country Matters"
 "This Room"
 "Rhodes"
 "Spring, 480 BC"
 "Near Klamath"
"Autumn"
 "Winter Insomnia"
 "Prosser"
 "At Night the Salmon Move"
 "With a Telescope Rod on Cowiche Creek"
 "Poem for Dr Pratt, a Lady Pathologist"
 "Wes Hardin: from a Photograph"
 "Marriage"
 "The Other Life"
 "The Mailman as Cancer Patient"
 "Poem for Hemingway & WC Williams"
 "Torture"
 "Bobber"
 "Highway 99e from Chico"
 "The Cougar"
 "The Current"
 "Hunter"
 "Trying to Sleep Late on a Saturday Morning in November"
 "Louise"
 "Poem for Karl Wallenda, Aerialist Supreme"
 "Deschutes River"
 "Forever"
 "Woolworth’s, 1954"
 "Radio Waves"
 "Movement"
 "Hominy and Rain"
 "The Road"
 "Fear"
 "Romanticism"
 "The Ashtray"
 "Still Looking Out for Number One"
 "Where Water Comes Together With Other Water"
 "Happiness"
 "The Old Days"
 "Our first House in Sacramento"
 "Next Year"
 "To My Daughter"
 "Anathema"
 "Energy"
 "Locking Yourself Out, Then Trying to Get Back In"
 "Medicine"
 "Wenas Ridge"
 "Reading"
 "Rain"
 "Money"
 "Aspens"
 "At Least"
 "The Grant"
 "My Boat"
 "The Poem I Didn't Write"
 "Work"
 "In The Year 2020"
 "The Juggler at Heaven’s Gate"
 "My Daughter and Apple Pie"
 "Commerce"
 "The Fishing Pole of the Drowned Man"
 "A Walk"
 "My Dad’s Wallet"
 "Ask Him"
 "Next Door"
 "The Caucasus: a Romance"
 "A Forge, and a Scythe"
 "The Pipe"
 "Listening"
 "In Switzerland
 "A Squall"
 "My Crow"
 "The Party"
 "After Rainy Days"
 "Interview"
 "Blood"
 "Tomorrow"
 "Grief"
 "Harley’s Swans"
"Elk Camp"
"The Windows of the Summer Vacation Houses"
"Memory 1"
"Away"
"Music"
"Plus"
"All Her Life"
"The Hat"
"Late Night with Fog and Horses"
"Venice"
"The Eve of Battle"
"Extirpation"
"The Catch"
"My Death"
"To Begin With"
"The Cranes"
"A Haircut"
"Happiness in Cornwall"
"Afghanistan"
"In a Marine Light Near Sequim, Washington"
"Eagles"
"Yesterday, snow"
"Reading Something in the Restaurant"
"A Poem Not Against Songbirds"
"Late Afternoon, April 8, 1984"
 "My work"
 "The Trestle"
 "For Tess"
"This Morning"
"What You Need for Painting"
"An Afternoon"
"Circulation"
"The Cobweb"
"Balsa Wood"
"The Projectile"
"The Mail"
 "The Autopsy Room"
"Where They’d Lived"
 "Memory 2"
 "The Car"
 "Stupid"
 "Union Street: San Francisco, Summer 1975"
 "Bonnard’s Nudes"
 "Jean’s TV"
 "Mesopotamia"
 "The Jungle"
 "Hope"
 "The House Behind This One"
 "Limits"
 "The Sensitive Girl"
"The minuet"
 "Egress"
 "Spell"
 "From the East, Light"
 "A Tall Order"
 "The Author of Her Misfortune"
 "Powder-Monkey"
 "Earwigs"
 "Nyquil"
 "The Possible"
 "Shiftless"
 "The Young Fire Eaters of Mexico City"
 " Where the Groceries Went"
 "What I Can Do"
 "The Little Room"
 "Sweet Light"
 "The Garden"
 "Son"
 "Kafka’s Watch"
 "The Lightning Speed of the Past"
 "Vigil"
 "In the Lobby of the Hotel del Mayo"
 "Bahia, Brazil"
 "The Phenomenon"
 "Wind"
 "Migration"
 "Sleeping"
 "The River"
 "The Best Time of the Day"
 "Scale"
 "Company"
 "Yesterday"
"The Schooldesk"
 "Cutlery"
 "The Pen"
 "The Prize"
 "An Account"
 "The Meadow"
 "Loafing"
 "Sinew"
 "Waiting"
 "The Debate"
"Its Course"
"September"
"The White Field"
 "Shooting"
"The Window"
"Heels"
"The Phone Booth"
"Cadillacs and Poetry"
"Simple"
"The Scratch"
"Mother"
"The Child"
"The Fields"
"After Reading Two Towns in Provence"
"Evening"
"The Rest"
 "Slippers"
"Asia"
"The Gift"
 "Wet Picture - Jaroslav Seifert"
 "Thermopylae"
 "Two Worlds"
 "Smoke and Deception - Anton Chekhov"
"In a Greek Orthodox Church Near Daphne"
"For the Record"
"Transformation"
"Threat"
"Conspirators"
"This Word Love"
"Don’t Run - Anton Chekhov"
"Woman Bathing"
 "The Name - Tomas Transtromer"
 "Looking for Work 2"
"The World Book Salesman"
 "The Toes"
"The Moon, the Train"
"Two Carriages - Anton Chekhov"
"Miracle"
"My Wife"
"Wine"
"After the Fire - Anton Chekhov"
"From a Journal of Southern Rivers - Charles Wright"
"The Kitchen"
"Songs in the Distance - Anton Chekhov"
"Suspenders"
"What You Need to Know for Fishing - Stephen Oliver"
"Oyntment to Alure Fish to the Bait - James Chetham"
"The Surgeon"
"Night Dampness - Anton Chekhov"
"Another Mystery"
"Return to Kraków in 1880 - Czeslaw Milosz"
"Sunday Night"
"The Painter & the Fish"
"At Noon - Anton Chekhov"
"Artaudv
"Caution"
"One More"
"At the Bird Market - Anton Chekhov"
"His Bathrobe Pockets Stuffed with Notes"
"The March into Russia"
"Some Prose on Poetry"
"Poems"
 "Letter"
"The Young Girls"
"From Epilogue - Robert Lowell"
 "The Offending Eel"
"Sorrel - Anton Chekhov"
 "The Attic"
"Margo"
"On an Old Photograph of My Son"
"Five O’clock in the Morning - Anton Chekhov"
"Summer Fog"
"Hummingbird"
 "Out"
"Downstream - Anton Chekhov"
 "The Net"
 "Nearly"
 "Foreboding - Anton Chekhov"
 "Quiet Nights"
 "Sparrow Nights - Anton Chekhov"
 "Lemonade"
 "Such Diamonds - Anton Chekhov"
 "Wake Up"
 "What the Doctor Said"
 "Let’s Roar, Your Honor - Anton Chekhov"
 "Proposal"
 "Cherish"
 "Gravy"
 "No Need"
 "Through the Boughs"
 "After-Glow"
 "Late Fragment"
 "The Brass Ring"
 "Beginnings"
 "In the Trenches with Robert Graves"
 "The Man Outside"
 "Adultery"
 "For the Egyptian Coin Today, Arden, Thank You"
 "Seeds"
 "Betrayal"
 "The Contact"
 "Something is Happening"
 "A Summer in Sacramento"
 "Reaching"
 "Soda Crackers"
 "Those Days"
 "On the Pampas Tonight"
 "Poem on My Birthday, July 2"
 "Return"
 "The Sunbather, to Herself"
 "No Heroics, Please"

Non Fiction
Essays

Occasions

Introductions

Book Reviews

Other works
At College
Carver's first publication was in the Chico State student newspaper, The Wildcat, on October 31, 1958. His contribution was a letter to the editor entitled "Where Is Intellect?", which complained about the apathy of students on campus. In 1962, Carver wrote an absurdist one-act play entitled Carnations, which was staged on his college's campus on May 11 and received mostly negative feedback. The play was published in 1992 by Engdahl Typography.

A fragment of Carver's unfinished novel The Augustine Notebooks was published in Iowa Review (Summer 1979), and later collected in Call If You Need Me (2000) and Collected Stories (2009). Additionally, Carver had accepted an advance on an unwritten novel from McGraw-Hill and planned to write a novel he imagined as "an African Queen sort of thing" set in German East Africa after World War I. Carver later admitted he stopped working on the novel after two weeks, and it appears that nothing of it exists beyond the published fragment.

In 1982, Carver was approached by director Michael Cimino with the idea of reworking a screenplay on the life of Fyodor Dostoevsky. Carver asked Tess Gallagher to assist him in the project. The movie was never produced but the screenplay, entitled Dostoevsky, was published by Capra (Santa Barbara, 1985).

Editing
Carver served as the founding editor of the Chico State literary magazine Selection in 1960 and the UC Santa Cruz journal Quarry (later Quarry West) in 1971. He also edited the Spring 1963 issue of Toyon at Humboldt State. Carver also selected the contents for the book Syracuse Poems and Stories 1980 (Syracuse, N.Y.: Department of English, Syracuse University, 1980). He also selected, along with Shannon Ravenel, the stories included in The Best American Short Stories 1986 (Boston: Houghton Mifflin, 1986) and edited American Short Story Masterpieces (New York: Delacorte Press, 1987) with Tom Jenks.

References
General
 Carol Sklenicka, Raymond Carver: A Writer's Life'', New York: Simon & Schuster, 2009, pp. 495–500.

Bibliographies by writer
Bibliographies of American writers
Poetry bibliographies